Emily Campbell (born 6 May 1994) is a British weightlifter, the most successful British weightlifter of modern times. In 2021, competing in the +87 kg category, Campbell became both European champion, and the first British woman to win an Olympic medal in the sport, with silver at the 2020 Summer Olympics in Tokyo. In 2022 she retained her European title, won the Gold medal at her home Commonwealth Games in a new Commonwealth Games record, and upgraded her 2021 World Championships bronze medal to a silver in Bogota.

Biography
Campbell is from the Snape Wood estate in Bulwell, Nottinghamshire. She graduated from Leeds Beckett University with a Sports Science degree in 2016.

Campbell competed in the women's +90 kg event at the 2018 Commonwealth Games, winning the bronze medal. In the following year she came third in the 2019 European Championships gaining another bronze medal. In early 2021 she became the European champion after winning in Moscow in the +87 kg category.

At the 2020 Summer Olympics in Tokyo (held in 2021 due to the COVID-19 pandemic), Campbell became the first British female weightlifter to win a medal at the Olympics, with a silver in the women's +87 kg event. Later that year, she went on to earn a bronze medal at the World Championships in Tashkent, Uzbekistan.

She won the gold medal in her event at the 2022 European Weightlifting Championships held in Tirana, Albania.

References

External links
 

1994 births
Living people
Alumni of Leeds Beckett University
English female weightlifters
Sportspeople from Nottingham
Weightlifters at the 2018 Commonwealth Games
Weightlifters at the 2022 Commonwealth Games
Commonwealth Games gold medallists for England
Commonwealth Games bronze medallists for England
Commonwealth Games medallists in weightlifting
European Weightlifting Championships medalists
Weightlifters at the 2020 Summer Olympics
Olympic weightlifters of Great Britain
Olympic silver medallists for Great Britain
Olympic medalists in weightlifting
Medalists at the 2020 Summer Olympics
English Olympic medallists
21st-century British women
20th-century British women
Medallists at the 2018 Commonwealth Games
Medallists at the 2022 Commonwealth Games